The following list includes notable people who were born or have lived in Eureka, California.

Academics and writing

Business and philanthropy

Media and art

Acting

Music 

 Sara Bareilles, musical artist
 Blackhouse (Brian Ladd), musical artist
 Trevor Dunn, musical artist
 Ernie Earnshaw, musician
 Mindy Gledhill, musical artist
  El Hefe (Aaron Abeyta), musical artist
 Mel Lyman, musician and film maker,
 Alexander McCurdy, organist and educator
 Michael Moore, musician
 Parasite (Armin Elsaesser), musician
 Mike Patton, musical artist and lead vocalist of Faith No More
 Trey Spruance, musical artist

Military 

 Robert M. Viale, U.S. Medal of Honor recipient
 Stephen Girard Whipple, 49er, newspaper editor, Union Army officer, and politician

Politics and law

 Bob L. Beers, politician
 David Cobb, presidential candidate and orator
 Thomas Cottrell, politician
 James G. Crichton, politician
 James Gillett, Governor of California
 Peter D. Hannaford, political adviser and author associated with Ronald W. Reagan 
 Frank C. Newman, Supreme Court of California associate justice

Crime 

 Wayne Adam Ford, serial killer

Sports

Baseball 

 Lafayette Henion, Major League baseball pitcher
 Dane Iorg, Major League baseball player
 Garth Iorg, Major League baseball player
 John Jaso, Major League baseball catcher and designated hitter
 Eddie Kearse, Major League baseball catcher
 Bill Kenworthy, Major League baseball player
 Roy Partee, Major League baseball catcher
 Greg Shanahan, Major League baseball pitcher
 Ned Yost, Major League baseball manager

Basketball 

 Al Brightman, basketball player and coach
 Mo Charlo, professional basketball player

Bowling 

 Walter Ray Williams, Jr., professional bowler

Cricket 

 Dennis Silk, cricketer

Football 

 Dave Harper, football player
 Rey Maualuga, professional football player
 Mike Nott, professional football player
 Maurice Purify, professional football player
 Elbie Schultz (1917–2002), collegiate All-American and NFL football player
 John Woodcock, football player

Martial arts  

 Nate Quarry, professional fighter

Rowing 

 Kevin Still, Olympic bronze medalist in rowing

Volleyball 

 Heather Erickson, Paralympic volleyball player

References

Eureka
Eureka